Ulmus changii var. changii is a variety of tree endemic to elevations of  –  in the Chinese provinces of Anhui, Fujian, Hubei, Hunan, Jiangsu, Jiangxi, Sichuan, and Zhejiang.

Description
The variety is distinguished by Fu as having "Leaf blade adaxially glabrous or pubescent on veins. Flowers from floral buds on fascicled cymes. Flowers and fruits March–April".

Cultivation
The tree is not known to be in cultivation beyond China.

References

changii var. changii
Trees of China
Flora of China
Trees of Asia
Flora of Zhejiang
Ulmus articles missing images
Elm species and varieties